The 2016 Open Engie Saint-Gaudens Midi-Pyrénées was a professional tennis tournament played on outdoor clay courts. It was the twentieth edition of the tournament and part of the 2016 ITF Women's Circuit, offering a total of $50,000+H in prize money. It took place in Saint-Gaudens, France, on 9–15 May 2016.

Singles main draw entrants

Seeds 

 1 Rankings as of 2 May 2016.

Other entrants 
The following players received wildcards into the singles main draw:
  Deniz Khazaniuk
  Ariadna Martí Riembau
  Victoria Muntean
  Emmanuelle Salas

The following players received entry from the qualifying draw:
  Audrey Albié
  Amanda Carreras
  Beatriz Haddad Maia
  Natalia Vikhlyantseva

The following player received entry by a lucky loser spot:
  Manon Arcangioli
  Renata Voráčová

The following player received entry by a protected ranking:
  Melanie Oudin

Champions

Singles

 Irina Khromacheva def.  Maria Sakkari, 1–6, 7–6(7–3), 6–1

Doubles

 Demi Schuurs /  Renata Voráčová def.  Nicola Geuer /  Viktorija Golubic, 6–1, 6–2

External links 
 2016 Open Engie Saint-Gaudens Midi-Pyrénées at ITFtennis.com
 Official website  

2016 ITF Women's Circuit
2016 in French tennis
Engie